Pablo Pérez Tremps (22 August 1956 – 16 July 2021) was a Spanish judge on the Constitutional Court and professor of constitutional law.

Early life 
Pérez Tremps was born on 22 August 1956 in Madrid, Spain.

Pérez Tremps graduated from the Complutense University of Madrid with a law degree in 1978.

Career 

Pérez Tremps joined the Constitutional Court of Spain in June 2004, for a nine-year term. Pérez Tremps left the court in June 2013.

Pérez Tremps was awarded the Medal of the Order of Constitutional Merit on 5 December 2014, in Madrid.

Pérez Tremps died on 16 July 2021, at the age of 64.

Publications

References

External links 

 Coverage of Pablo Pérez Tremps in El País

1956 births
2021 deaths
20th-century Spanish judges
Spanish academics
Lawyers from Madrid
Recipients of the Order of Constitutional Merit
21st-century Spanish judges